Symphyta is a genus of moths in the family Lasiocampidae. The genus was erected by Turner in 1902. All species were described from Australia.

Species
From Lepidoptera and Some Other Life Forms:
Symphyta psaropis Turner, 1902
Symphyta nyctopis Turner, 1902
Symphyta colpodes Turner, 1924
Symphyta oxygramma (Lower, 1902)
Symphyta nephelodes (Turner, 1924)

External links

Lasiocampidae